Dania Madiqyzy Espaeva (Dänia Madiqyzy Espaeva, ; born 5 March 1961) is a Kazakh politician and a member of the Mazhilis from 24 March 2016. She was the first ever Kazakh woman to be a presidential candidate during the 2019 Kazakh presidential election.

Biography
Espaeva was born on 5 March 1961 in the village of Jaisan in the Martuk District of the Aktobe Region.

In 1982, she graduated with honors from the Alma-Ata Credit and Accounting College and then from the Kazakh State Academy of Management of Alma-Ata with a degree in economics in 1993.

From 2008 to 2016, Espaeva was a member of the Aktobe Regional Maslihat, on the commission on family and women.

Since 24 March 2016, she is a member of the Mazhilis from the Ak Zhol Democratic Party on the Finance and Budget Committee.

On 24 April 2019, Espaeva became registered as candidate for the 2019 Kazakh presidential election for the Ak Zhol party which took place on 9 June, winning 5% of the popular vote.

Personal life
Espaeva is married and has two sons and two grandchildren.

References

1961 births
Living people
Ak Zhol Democratic Party politicians
Kazakhstani economists
21st-century Kazakhstani women politicians
21st-century Kazakhstani politicians
People from Aktobe Region
Members of the Mazhilis